René Devos (26 July 1921 – 21 January 2005) was a Belgian footballer. He played in six matches for the Belgium national football team from 1945 to 1946.

References

External links
 

1921 births
2005 deaths
Belgian footballers
Belgium international footballers
Place of birth missing
Association football midfielders
Beerschot A.C. players